Burnt alive  may refer to:

Death by burning
"Burnt Alive", a song from Scream, Dracula, Scream!